Oldborough is a village in Devon, England. It is near the village of Morchard Bishop. Oldborough has a population of just under 1,000 people. The only remaining pub is the London Inn. The village has a school and post office.

Villages in Devon